Malangatana Valente Ngwenya (6 June 1936 – 5 January 2011) was a Mozambican painter and poet.  He frequently exhibited work under his first name alone, as Malangatana. He died on 5 January 2011 in Matosinhos, Portugal.

Life
Born in Matalana, a village in the south of Portuguese Mozambique, Ngwenya spent his early life attending mission schools and helping his mother on the farm.  At the age of 12 he went to the city of Lourenço Marques (now Maputo) to find work, becoming ball boy for a tennis club in 1953.  This allowed him to resume his education, and he took night classes, through which he developed an interest in art. He was encouraged by Augusto Cabral, a member of the tennis club, who gave him materials and helped him to sell his art, and also by Pancho Guedes, another member of the tennis club.

In 1958 Ngwenya attended some functions of Nucleo de Arte, a local artists' organization, and received support from the painter Ze Julio.  The next year Ngwenya exhibited publicly for the first time, as part of a group show; two years later came his first solo exhibition, at the age of 25.  In 1963 some of his poetry was published in the literary magazine Black Orpheus, and his work was included in the anthology Modern Poetry from Africa.

In 1964, Ngwenya, who had joined the nationalistic FRELIMO guerrilla, was detained by the PIDE, the Portuguese secret police of the Estado Novo regime, and spent 18 months in jail. He was given a grant from the Lisbon-based Gulbenkian Foundation in 1971, and studied engraving and ceramics in Portugal, Europe. Back to Mozambique, Africa, his art was exhibited several times in both Lourenço Marques and Lisbon until Independence.

After the independence of Mozambique, due to the events of the Carnation Revolution of April 1974, Ngwenya openly rejoined FRELIMO, now the single-party communist organization that was ruling the new country, and worked in political mobilization events and alphabetization campaigns. In 1979 he participated in the exhibition Moderne Kunst aus Afrika, which was organised in West Berlin as part of the program of the first Horizonte - Festival der Weltkulturen.

After 1981 he worked full-time as an artist. His work was shown throughout Africa, and is in the collection of the National Museum of African Art in Washington, DC. In addition, he executed numerous murals, including for FRELIMO and UNESCO. A large mural by him decorated the stairwell of the original building housing the Africa Centre, London, in King Street, Covent Garden. The mural was installed in the new premises of the Africa Centre, opened in Southwark in June 2022.

Ngwenya also helped to start a number of cultural institutions in Mozambique, and was a founder of the Mozambican Peace Movement. He was awarded the Nachingwea Medal for his Contribution to Mozambican Culture, and was made a Grande Oficial da Ordem do Infante D. Henrique. In 1997 he was named a UNESCO Artist for Peace and received a Prince Claus Award.

He was awarded a degree honoris causa by the University of Évora in 2010.

He died at the age of 74, on 5 January 2011 in Matosinhos, northern Portugal, after a long illness.

References

Further reading
 Navarro, J., & H. C. McGuire (2003), Malangatana, Mkuki na Nyota Publishers. , available through Michigan State University Press.

External links

 Hendrik Folkerts, Felicia Mings, and Constantine Petridis, eds. Malangatana: Mozambique Modern—The Modern Series at the Art Institute of Chicago. Art Institute of Chicago, 2021. https://doi.org/10.53269/9780865593138
Photo portrait of Malangatana, "Duncan Campbell's Maputo photo diary", The Guardian, February 2005.
 Malangatana Mural for the Center for African Studies, Eduardo Mondlane University.
 Alda Costa, "Arte e Artistas em Moçambique: falam diferentes gerações e modernidades (Parte 1)" , BUALA, 11 January 2012.
 African Contemporary | Art Gallery
 "Malangatana Ngwenya" at Tate.

1936 births
2011 deaths
20th-century Mozambican painters
21st-century Mozambican painters
Mozambican sculptors
Recipients of the Nachingwea Medal